R326 road may refer to:
 R326 road (Ireland)
 R326 road (South Africa)